Kannemeyer is a surname. Notable people with the surname include:

Allen Kannemeyer (born 1959), South African Anglican bishop
Anton Kannemeyer (born 1967), South African comics artist
Daniel Rossouw Kannemeyer (1843–1925), South African archaeologist and paleontologist
David Kannemeyer (born 1977), South African footballer
John Christoffel Kannemeyer (1939–2011), South African literary historian
Quinton Kannemeyer (born 1984), South African cricketer 
Tiaan Kannemeyer (born 1978), South African cyclist